KTRH is a commercial radio station licensed to Houston, Texas and owned by iHeartMedia that airs a talk radio format. Its studios are located along the West Loop Freeway (I-610) in the city's Uptown district. The transmitter site is located at a four-tower facility in unincorporated Liberty County, off Cox Road in Dayton.

KTRH broadcasts with  around the clock, the highest power permitted by the Federal Communications Commission for commercial AM stations.  But because it transmits on AM 740, a Canadian clear channel frequency, the station uses a directional antenna to protect Class A station CFZM in Toronto. During the day, the station provides at least secondary coverage to most of the southeast quadrant of Texas–as far west as Austin and San Antonio and as far north as College Station and Lufkin–as well as much of southwestern Louisiana. At night, the station switches to a directional pattern with a significant null to the east in order to protect CFZM, concentrating the signal in Houston, the Golden Triangle and Victoria.

KTRH is the Southern Texas primary entry point station for the Emergency Alert System.

KTRH is one of the oldest radio stations in the United States, and was first licensed to the city of Austin on April 22, 1922, as WCM.

History

Establishment in Austin

The station was first licensed, with the randomly assigned call letters of WCM, on April 22, 1922, to the University of Texas at Austin. (Initially call letters beginning with "W" were generally assigned to stations east of an irregular line formed by the western state borders from North Dakota south to Texas, with calls beginning with "K" going only to stations in states west of that line. In January 1923 the Mississippi River was established as the new boundary, thus after this date Texas stations generally received call letters starting with "K" instead of "W".) WCM was authorized to broadcast on both the "entertainment" wavelength of 360 meters and the "market and weather" wavelength of 485 meters.

The university ultimately decided that it could not afford the expense of operating a radio station, and in early 1929 sold KUT to a group that planned to convert it from an educational to a commercial station.

Move to Houston

Jesse H. Jones, operator of the Rice Hotel (now the Post Rice Lofts) in Houston, Texas and owner of the Houston Chronicle, took over the station to meet its competition, the Houston Post, which was the first of the local papers with a radio affiliation (KPRC). In December 1929, the station's call letters were changed to KTRH (standing for The Rice Hotel), and its main studio was moved to Houston. (Simultaneously, station KGDR in San Antonio, Texas was renamed KUT and moved to Austin (now KJFK)). In March 1930, the station began broadcasting from the Rice Hotel. KTRH aired shows from the Columbia Broadcasting System as part of its initial programming.

In 1947, Houston's first FM station was added,  KTRH-FM.  The FM station mostly simulcast KTRH's programming when few people had FM radios.

In 1965, KTRH-AM-FM were acquired by the Rusk Corporation. Under Rusk ownership, KTRH-FM experimented with progressive rock programs at night while simulcasting AM 740 in the daytime. In , Rusk switched the FM station over to a full time rock format as KLOL.

Noted newsman Dan Rather worked for KTRH in the late .  He was a reporter and newscaster. In , KTRH carried broadcasts of the Houston Buffs minor league baseball team. Rather was the main play by play announcer.  The Gallup Poll's editor in chief Frank Newport was also a noted talk show host and news director at KTRH in the early . CBS Sports announcer Jim Nantz worked at KTRH while attending the University of Houston.

Ownership change
In 1993, Evergreen Media bought KTRH and KLOL for $49 million.  Evergreen Media was later merged into Chancellor Media, which in turn was bought by Clear Channel Communications, the forerunner to today's owner, iHeartMedia.  In 1995, Clear Channel also acquired KTRH's chief talk radio competitor, AM 950 KPRC.  That means Clear Channel, and now iHeartMedia, has two talk radio stations in Houston, each airing slightly different programming.  However, Houston-based syndicated host Michael Berry has shows on both stations, airing at different times.

KTRH was the Houston affiliate for CBS Radio News, before switching to ABC News Radio in 1997 and then to Fox News Radio in 2003.  In early 2016, KTRH switched back to ABC.  The Fox News affiliation moved to sister station KPRC.

Programming
Jimmy Barrett and Shara Fryer (longtime former co-anchor at Houston's ABC-TV station KTRK, a sister station to KTRH during its early history) host the station's morning-drive news program, Houston's Morning News. Michael Berry, who hosts a regionally syndicated program based out of KTRH, airs in late mornings and again in early evenings; The Clay Travis and Buck Sexton Show and The Sean Hannity Show (both syndicated via Premiere Networks) air in early and late afternoons, respectively. The Mark Levin Show (syndicated via Westwood One) and Our American Stories with Lee Habeeb air in late evenings, while Coast to Coast AM (via Premiere) airs in overnights. This Morning, America's First News with Gordon Deal (via Compass Media Networks) airs in the early morning hours. In addition to local newscasts, KTRH has a news-sharing partnership with KPRC-TV.

Prior to the 2013 season, KTRH was the flagship station for the Houston Astros Radio Network; the play-by-play rights have since been transferred to KBME.

References

External links
KTRH Official Website

FCC History cards for KTRH (covering 1927-1981 for KUT / KTRH)

News and talk radio stations in the United States
Radio stations established in 1922
TRH
IHeartMedia radio stations
1922 establishments in Texas